Petre Tsiskarishvili is a Georgian politician. He served as Minister of Agriculture of Georgia from 2006 to 2008.

Tsiskarishvili has previous work experience as Minister of Agriculture (2006 - 2008), Commissary of the President to Kakheti region (2004 - 2006), Logistic Manager, Kartu KTF (1998 - 1999), Assistant to the Minister of Industry (1997 - 1998), Publishing Company "Scholz Publishing Co.", President/Founder (1996 - 1997) and Law Firm "K G O", Secretary (1994 - 1996).

As of January 2022, Tsiskarishvili was the General Secretary of the United National Movement, the largest opposition party in Georgia. He has stated that the only options for the occupied regions of South Ossetia and Abkhazia is for the complete withdrawal of Russian troops and reintegration with the country of Georgia.

References

External links 
Official biography

1974 births
Living people
Government ministers of Georgia (country)
Politicians from Tbilisi
Tbilisi State University alumni